The Sweetness of Love (transliterated as Ya Halawaat al-Hob) is an Egyptian film released in 1952. The film is based on the Franco-German film, A Night in Paradise, released in 1932 in German and the following year as Une nuit au paradis in French.

Synopsis
Shukria (Lola Sedki) is a spoiled girl whose father Fouad Shafiq) fulfills her every command. She wants to marry the singer Nabil (Mohamed Fawzi) to inherit the fortune of his uncle (Suleiman Naguib). Shukria's father invites Nabil to a party to help her charm him. A clothing store attendant (Naima Akef) arrives and loves to sing and dance. Nabil and his uncle both fall in love with her at first sight.

Songs
The songs in the film include lyrics by Abo El Seoud El Ebiary, Mamoun el-Shenawy, Mustafa al-Sayed, and Fathi Qura.

References

External links 
 IMDb page
 El Cinema page
 Dhliz page
 Karohat page

Egyptian comedy films
1952 films